Millu (Aymara for a kind of salpeter / light brown, reddish, fair-haired, dark chestnut, Quechua for salty,  Hispanicized spelling Millo) is a mountain in the Wansu mountain range in the Andes of Peru, about  high. It is situated in the Apurímac Region, Antabamba Province, Oropesa District. Millu lies southwest of Puka Urqu and northwest of Mina Q'asa.

References 

Mountains of Peru
Mountains of Apurímac Region